Thomas & Friends is a children's television series about the engines and other characters working on the railways of the Island of Sodor, and is based on The Railway Series books written by the Reverend W. Awdry.

This article lists and details episodes from the thirteenth series of  the show, which was first broadcast in 2010. This series was narrated by Michael Angelis for the United Kingdom audiences, while Michael Brandon narrated the episodes for the United States audiences. Mark Moraghan later re-narrated "Snow Tracks" for the Santa's Little Engine DVD.

This was Marion Edwards' first series as executive producer.

This series was released following the release of the feature-length special DVD Hero of the Rails in September 2009 and the theatrical and video releases of select episodes. This series introduced computer-generated imagery as a replacement for the show's long-standing model animation, as well as a voice cast rather than an individual actor's narration.

Production
Beginning with this series, Nitrogen Studios began providing the animation.

Director Steve Asquith had left the show after the previous series, after working on twelve series and directing five series, while Simon Spencer also stepped down as producer. Christopher Skala was joined by Marion Edwards as executive producer. Ed Welch left after The Great Discovery, while Robert Hartshorne remained. Greg Tiernan and Nicole Stinn replaced Asquith and Spencer as the director and producer.

Note: The series was filmed in 2009, but would not be aired until January 2010.

Episodes

On 7 November 2009, four select episodes ("Splish, Splash, Splosh!", "Slippy Sodor", "Play Time", and "Snow Tracks") were screened theatrically in an event called "Splish, Splash, Splosh". The episodes were then released on a DVD of the same name in the United States, which was later released in the UK on 1 March 2010. Another event, again in the United States and titled  "Thomas and the Runaway Kite", was screened on 9 January 2010, and showed a further 4 episodes. The two songs, "Sounds" and "Determination" by Ed Welch, were introduced during Series 13 after the story. The thirteenth series aired in the United States on 5 September 2010.
 In October 2010, the thirteenth series also aired on Nick Jr. UK.

Voice cast

A HiT Entertainment press release from 2007 stated that "3 upcoming Thomas & Friends television series" would be narrated by Pierce Brosnan. Although the statement was made prior to Season 12, HiT confirmed that Brosnan would only appear as a guest narrator on The Great Discovery.

Music videos
Roll Along
Go, Go Thomas
Thomas, You're the Leader
The Sound Song
Determination
Engine Roll Call

iTunes Release
'Thomas & Friends: Splish, Splash, Splosh!' was released in the United Kingdom iTunes Store on 1 March 2010. It consisted of four episodes, which were:
Splish, Splash, Splosh!
Slippy Sodor
Snow Tracks
Play Time
The programme can be bought as a series or individual episodes.

References

2009 British television seasons
2010 British television seasons
Thomas & Friends seasons